The DY postcode area, also known as the Dudley postcode area, is a group of fourteen postcode districts in England, within eight post towns. These cover the south-western part of the West Midlands (including Dudley, Tipton, Brierley Hill, Stourbridge and Kingswinford) and north Worcestershire (including Kidderminster, Bewdley and Stourport-on-Severn), plus the south-westernmost part of Staffordshire and a small part of south-east Shropshire.

Mail for this area is sorted, along with mail for the adjacent WV postcode area, at the North West Midlands Mail Centre in Wolverhampton.



Coverage
The approximate coverage of the postcode districts:

|-
! DY1
| DUDLEY
| Dudley town centre, Woodsetton (part of)
| Dudley
|-
! DY2
| DUDLEY
| Dudley town centre, Netherton, Woodside
| Dudley
|-
! DY3
| DUDLEY
| Gornal, Himley, Sedgley, Swindon, Gospel End, Woodsetton (part of)
| Dudley, South Staffordshire 
|-
! DY4
| TIPTON
| Tipton, Coseley (part of), Tividale (part of)
| Sandwell, Dudley
|-
! DY5
| BRIERLEY HILL
| Brierley Hill, Amblecote (north and east of railway), Quarry Bank, Withymoor Village
| Dudley
|-
! DY6
| KINGSWINFORD
| Kingswinford, Ashwood, Wall Heath
| Dudley, South Staffordshire
|-
! DY7
| STOURBRIDGE
| Enville, Kinver, Stourton
| South Staffordshire
|-
! DY8
| STOURBRIDGE
| Stourbridge town centre, Amblecote, Hagley (part of), Wollaston, Wordsley
| Dudley, Bromsgrove, South Staffordshire
|-
! DY9
| STOURBRIDGE
| Hagley (part of), Lye, Pedmore, Broome, Drayton
| Bromsgrove, Dudley, Wyre Forest
|-
! DY10
| KIDDERMINSTER
| Kidderminster (east), Chaddesley Corbett, Blakedown, Cookley
| Wyre Forest, Wychavon
|-
! DY11
| KIDDERMINSTER
| Kidderminster (west), Hartlebury
| Wyre Forest, Wychavon
|-
! DY12
| BEWDLEY
| Bewdley, Arley, Hartlebury, Wolverley, Kinlet
| Wyre Forest, Shropshire
|-
! DY13
| STOURPORT-ON-SEVERN
| Stourport-on-Severn, Areley Kings, Astley, Dunley, Crossway Green, Dunhampton
| Wyre Forest, Malvern Hills, Wychavon
|-
! DY14
| KIDDERMINSTER
| Cleobury Mortimer, Rock, Far Forest, Bayton, Mamble
| Shropshire, Wyre Forest, Malvern Hills
|}

Map

See also
List of postcode areas in the United Kingdom
Postcode Address File

References

External links
Royal Mail's Postcode Address File
A quick introduction to Royal Mail's Postcode Address File (PAF)

Dudley
Postcode areas covering the West Midlands (region)